Qatar is a peninsula with a 563 kilometre-long coastline, numerous small islets, sandbars, and reefs. It is a popular destination with tourists in the Gulf Cooperation Council.

This is a list of beaches in Qatar.

Al Ghariya beach
Al Ghariyah beach is located 80 km north of Doha.

Khor Al Adaid
Khor Al Adaid is located near the Qatar-Saudi Arabia border. The holiday season lasts eight months.

Dukhan beach
80 km West of Doha, Dukhan is the centre of Qatar’s onshore oil industry and at the beginning of the 20th century had the only aircraft landing strip in the country.

Fuwairit beach 
Located 80 km north of Doha, Fuwairit beach has cliffs bordering a fine sandy bay with strange shapes in the rock face.

Zubarah beach

Zubarah beach is located near the Zubarah archaeological site, but is open only to those on guided tours.

Ras Abrouq beach
The road to the Ras Abrouq beach is 70 km west of Doha. Ras Abrouq is also known as (Bir Zekreet), it is a favourite beach spot for weekend campers in Qatar.

Umm Bab beach
90 km west of Doha, Umm Bab beach is also known as “Palm Tree Beach” because of the small cluster of palms at the end of the road alongside the small breakwater.

Maroona beach
Maroona beach is located 80 km north of Doha.

Al Thakhira beach
Al Thakhira is town with a nearby beach and island with mangroves.

Al Farkiya Beach 
Al Farkiya Beach is located in Al Khawr Town Rd and offers many facilities for visitors, including a garden.

Simaisma Family Beach 
As its name suggests, Simaisma beach is family-oriented, clean and safe. It is located in the north side of Doha.

Al Wakra Beach 
Al Wakra, the village is situated 10 km south of Doha, and the beach is about 15 km southeast of the village center. The family beach is known for mangroves and little fishes.

Sealine Beach 
Sealine Beach is located in Mesaieed, approximately 36 kilometres south of the capital, Doha. Sealine Beach is a great spot for fishing and camping, especially during the winter season.

Al Kharij Beach 
Al Kharij Beach is located in Umm Bab, this family beach is also known as Palm Tree Beach for its cluster of palm trees.

Dukhan Beach 
Dukhan Beach is located in Dukhan, approximately 80 kilometres west of the capital, Doha. Dukhan Beach is known for surfing, swimming and to watch fish and crabs.

Katara Beach 
Katara Beach is located in cultural village in Doha. Katara beach offers a selection of watersport activities. On weekdays, the beach is open from 9:30 am to sunset, while on weekend is open till 9:30pm.

See also
 List of protected areas of Qatar
 List of beaches
 List of beaches in Bahrain

References

Arabian Peninsula
Beaches
Beaches
Qatar